Burtakovka is a rural locality (a village) in Alegazovsky Selsoviet, Mechetlinsky District, Bashkortostan, Russia. The population was 248 as of 2010. There are 5 streets.

Geography 
Burtakovka is located 17 km southwest of Bolsheustyikinskoye (the district's administrative centre) by road. Alegazovo is the nearest rural locality.

References 

Rural localities in Mechetlinsky District